Mari Lynn Kruger Leavitt (née Hyzer; born 1968) is an American politician from Washington. She serves in the Washington House of Representatives for 28th legislative district in Pierce County.

Leavitt earned an associate degree from Tacoma Community College. She later earned bachelor's and master's degrees from Western Washington University before getting her PhD in Community College Leadership at Oregon State University.

She has served as the chair of the  Pierce County's Ethics Commission.

Leavitt was first elected in 2018, when she defeated Dick Muri, the incumbent Republican representative.

Election results

References

External links

Women state legislators in Washington (state)
Democratic Party members of the Washington House of Representatives
Living people
21st-century American politicians
21st-century American women politicians
1968 births